Charles of Lorraine, Duke of Mayenne (26 March 1554 – 3 October 1611), or Charles de Guise, was a French nobleman of the house of Guise and a military leader of the Catholic League, which he headed during the French Wars of Religion, following the assassination of his brothers at Blois in 1588. In 1596, when he made peace with Henry IV of France, the wars were essentially at an end.

Lieutenant to the Duke of Mayenne
Mayenne was the second son of Francis of Lorraine, Duke of Guise and Anna d'Este, the daughter of Ercole II d'Este, Duke of Ferrara and Renée of France. By 1570, he was pressuring his brother, Henry, to buy him a house in Paris and had taken the dangerous habit of wearing the color green which represented the House of Anjou, the current heir to the throne. In 1572, Mayenne left France, without royal dispensation, to fight the Ottoman Turks in Greece. Lorraine was forced to send a grovelling letter to Charles asking for the kings forgiveness of the "poor, hopeless and debauched boy", Mayenne himself would also have to seek the kings pardon. 

Mayenne took part in the siege of La Rochelle, and was elevated from marquis to duke and peer of France that same year. He went with Henry of Valois, Duke of Anjou (later Henry III of France), on his election as king of Poland, but soon returned to France to become the energetic supporter and lieutenant of his brother, Henry I, Duke of Guise.

In 1576, at the head of an unpaid royal army, Mayenne was unable to deter the 25,000 German army under John Casimir from reaching Moulins on 4 March. He gained conspicuous successes over the Huguenot forces in Poitou in 1577. After Henry III of France signed the Edict of Beaulieu, Mayenne was forced to swear to support the edict, due to the suspicion of him being the leader of the League of Peronne.

As governor of Burgundy, Mayenne raised the province in the cause of the Catholic League in 1585.  After the death of the heir to the throne, Francis, Duke of Anjou, on 10 June 1584, Mayenne and his brother, Henry, founded an association to keep Henry of Navarre from the throne of France. Mayenne, following his brother lead, captured Dijon, Macon and Auxonne.

The assassination of his brother, Henry, at Blois on 23–24 December 1588 left Mayenne at the head of the Catholic party.

Head of the Catholic League
The ambassador of the Republic of Venice, Giovanni Mocenigo, states that Mayenne had warned Henry III that there was a plot afoot to seize his person and to send him by force to Paris. At the time of the murder he was at Lyon, where he received a letter from the king saying that he had acted on his warning, and ordering him to retire to his government.

Mayenne professed obedience, but immediately made preparations for marching on Paris. After a vain attempt to recover those of his relatives who had been arrested at Blois, he proceeded to recruit troops in his government of Burgundy and in Champagne. Paris was devoted to the house of Guise and had been roused to fury by the news of the murder. Mayenne entered Gournay-sur-Marne in 1589, while Paris would not fall until 1590. He found it dominated by representatives of the sixteen quarters of Paris, all staunch supporters of the League.

He formed a council general to direct the affairs of the city and to maintain relations with the other towns faithful to the League. Each quarter sent four representatives, and Mayenne added representatives of the various trades and professions of Paris in order to counterbalance this revolutionary element. He constituted himself "lieutenant-general of the state and crown of France," taking his oath before the parlement of Paris.

In April Mayenne advanced on Tours. Henry III in his extremity sought an alliance with the Huguenot, Henry of Navarre (the future Henry IV of France), and the allied forces drove the leaguers back, and had laid siege to Paris when the assassination of Henry III by a Dominican friar changed the face of affairs and gave new strength to the Catholic party.

King-maker
Mayenne was urged to claim the crown for himself, but he was faithful to the official programme of the League and proclaimed Charles, Cardinal de Bourbon, at that time a prisoner in the hands of Henry IV, as Charles X of France, although this numbering is not accepted by historians. Henry IV retired to Dieppe, followed by Mayenne, who joined his forces with those of his cousin Charles, Duke of Aumale, and Charles II de Cossé, comte de Brissac, in a succession of fights in the neighbourhood of Arques (September 1589). He was defeated and out-marched by Henry IV, who moved on Paris, but retreated before Mayenne's forces.

In 1590 Mayenne received additions to his army from the Spanish Netherlands, and took the field again, only to suffer complete defeat at Ivry (14 March 1590). He then escaped to Mantes and in September collected a fresh army at Meaux, and with the assistance of Alexander Farnese, Duke of Parma, sent by Philip II of Spain, raised the siege of Paris, which was about to surrender to Henry IV. Mayenne feared with reason the designs of Philip II, and his difficulties were increased by the death of the Cardinal, the "king of the league."

Peacemaker 

The extreme section of the party, represented by the radical "Paris Sixteen", urged him to proceed to the election of a Catholic king and to accept the help and the claims of their Spanish Habsburg allies. Mayenne lacked the popular gifts of his brother, the Duke of Guise, and had no sympathy with the urban demagogues, inclining to the moderate side of his party, which began to urge reconciliation with Henry IV. He maintained the ancient forms of the constitution against the revolutionary policy of the Sixteen, who during his absence from Paris took the law into their own hands and in November 1591 executed one of the leaders of the more moderate party, Barnabé Brisson, president of the parlement. He returned to Paris and executed four of the chief malcontents. The power of the Sixteen diminished from that time, and with it the strength of the League.

Mayenne entered into negotiations with Henri IV while he was still appearing to consider with Philip II the succession to the French crown of the Infanta Isabella Clara Eugenia of Spain, daughter of Elizabeth of Valois and granddaughter of Henri II. He demanded that Henri IV complete his conversion to Catholicism before he was recognized by the adherents of the League. He also desired the continuation to himself of the high offices which had accumulated in his family and the reservation of their provinces to his relatives among the Leaguers.

In 1593 he summoned the States-General to Paris and placed before them the claims of the Infanta, but they protested against foreign intervention. Mayenne signed a truce at La Villette on 31 July 1593. The internal dissensions of the league continued to increase, and the principal chiefs submitted. In 1595, Mayenne and Juan Fernández de Velasco moved to take Dijon with a Catholic League army. They were defeated by King Henry IV at Fontaine-Française, 6 June 1595.  Mayenne finally made his peace only in October 1595. Henri IV allowed him the possession of Chalon-sur-Saône, of Seurre and Soissons for three years, made his son Henry governor of the Île-de-France and paid a large indemnity.

Marriage and children 
On 6 August 1576, Charles married Henriette of Savoy, Marquise of Villars, daughter of Honorat II of Savoy. They had:
Renée de Lorraine (d. 1638) married Mario Sforza and had issue
Henri, Duke of Mayenne (1578–1621) married Henriette Gonzaga, daughter of Louis Gonzaga, Duke of Nevers
Charles Emanuel, Count of Sommerive (1581–1609) never married;
Catherine of Lorraine (1585–1618) married Charles Gonzaga

See also
Duc de Mayenne
Love's Labour's Lost - Charles served as the basis for the character of Dumaine in the play.

Notes

References

Sources

1554 births
1611 deaths
Charles
Charles
Charles of Lorraine
Charles of Lorraine
French people of the French Wars of Religion
Grand Chamberlains of France
Admirals of France
Military personnel from Alençon
16th-century peers of France
17th-century peers of France